I~Comm Student Media is an organization involving students from all fields of study at Brigham Young University-Idaho. This organization covers major media and communication strategies, such as advertising, public relations, and news review. I~Comm also produces the university newspaper and operates its own in-house design agency, multimedia organization, copy editing team and sales/marketing group.

I~Comm Agency
The I~Comm advertising agency is an organization that provides clients with creative cross-media marketing and advertising. I~Comm also offers public relations services.

Graphic Design
Graphic Design is a team of creative illustrators and photographers that provide graphic design for all clients of I~Comm to enhance editorial design, advertising, and any additional requests by clients such as brochures, posters, photography, web pages, and newsletters.

Scroll
BYU-Idaho's student paper, Scroll, was founded in 1905 and first published as Student Rays, then The Purple Flash, then Viking Flashes and finally Scroll. One hundred years later in 2004, Scroll picked up the Associated Collegiate Press Newspaper Pacemaker Award at a convention in New York City.

Scroll went from a standard newspaper format to a tabloid fold in 2007 and merged with other campus communication organization to become a larger entity called I~Comm.

I~Comm Video Productions
Multimedia organization that produces special projects for I~Comm such as documentaries, podcasts, and instructional videos.

Scroll TV News
Students in I~Comm cover breaking news and create features focusing on campus and community events. Each story is posted online. Each semester, a group of students create a community feature that is aired on Local News 8, a local CBS and Fox affiliate].

I~Comm Sales
Sells ad space through the BYU-Idaho school paper, Scroll.

References

Brigham Young University–Idaho
Student newspapers published in Idaho